Nassarina thetys is a species of sea snail, a marine gastropod mollusk in the family Columbellidae, the dove snails.

Description

Distribution

References

Columbellidae
Gastropods described in 1998